Stephanosphaera is a genus of green algae in the family Haematococcaceae, containing the single species Stephanosphaera pluvialis.

Distribution
Stephanosphaera pluvialis is found in freshwater habitats. It is rare.

References

External links

Chlamydomonadales genera
Chlamydomonadales
Monotypic algae genera